The Hornbostel–Sachs system of musical instrument classification groups all instruments which make sound primarily by way of electrically driven oscillators. Though Sachs divided the category of electrophones into three distinct subcategories, specifying these three as:
51 = electrically actuated acoustic instruments,
52 = electrically amplified acoustic instruments, and
53 = instruments in which make sound primarily by way of electrically driven oscillators,
In the present day only instruments belonging to this last subcategory are considered "electronic musical instruments."

List

ANS synthesizer
Chamberlin
Mellotron
Clavioline
Croix Sonore
Electronde
Electronic drum
Electronic keyboard
Hammond organ
Moog modular synthesizer
Novachord
Ondes Martenot
Therevox
Ondioline
Oramics
Radiodrum
Spharophon
Stylophone
Synthesizer
Analog synthesizer
Digital synthesizer
Telharmonium
Theremin
Electro-Theremin
Trautonium

Sees also
List of classic synthesizers
List of Hammond organs

Electronic musical instruments
Electronic